Arctacarus is a genus of mites in the family Arctacaridae. They are found in tundra and mountain regions of Asia and North America.

Species
These three species are members of the genus Arctacarus:
 Arctacarus rostratus Evans, 1955
 Arctacarus beringianus Bregetova, 1977
 Arctacarus dzungaricus Bregetova, 1977

References

Mesostigmata